Stafford Louis Lightman  (born 7 September 1948) has been Professor of Medicine, University of Bristol, since 1993. He was president of the British Neuroscience Association 2017–2019.

Education 
Lightman was educated at Repton School and Gonville and Caius College, Cambridge (MA, MB BChir, PhD). He did his clinical training at Middlesex Hospital Medical School

Career and research 
Lightman started his research career working on catecholamine uptake mechanisms in Cambridge where, after completed his clinical studies at the Middlesex Hospital in London, he studied the role of opioid peptides and brain stem catecholamine pathways in the regulation of neurohypophysial hormone secretion. He laterinvestigated the dynamics underlying stress hormone secretion.

 Visiting Senior Scientist, Medical Research Council Neuro-Pharmacy Unit, Cambridge, 1980–81
 Wellcome Trust Senior Lecturer, St. Mary's Hospital Medical School and Honorary Consultant Physician and Endocrinologist, St Mary's Hospital, 1981–82
 Charing Cross and Westminster Medical School:
 Reader in Medicine, 1982–88
 Professor of Clinical Neuroendocrinology, Consultant Physician and Endocrinologist, 1988–92
 Honorary Senior Research Fellow, Institute of Neurology and Consultant Endocrinologist to the National Hospital for Neurology and Neurosurgery, 1988-
 Chairman, Pituitary Foundation, 1995-
 Founding Fellow of the Academy of Medical Sciences, 1998
 Editor-in-chief, Journal of Neuroendocrinology, 1989–96.
 Mortyn Jones Lecturer British Society for Neuroendocrinology, 2014

Honours and awards
Lightman was elected a Fellow of the Royal Society in 2017.

Personal life
He is the son of Harold Lightman, Queen's Counsel (QC) and the brother of Sir Gavin Lightman, QC.

References

1948 births
Living people
English Jews
People educated at Repton School
Alumni of Gonville and Caius College, Cambridge
Academics of the University of Bristol
Jewish scientists
British neurologists
British endocrinologists
Fellows of the Academy of Medical Sciences (United Kingdom)
Fellows of the Royal Society
English people of Lithuanian-Jewish descent
English people of Scottish descent
English people of German-Jewish descent
20th-century English medical doctors
21st-century English medical doctors